The C.H. Brown Cottage is a historic house at 34 Wright Street in Stoneham, Massachusetts.  Probably built in the 1830s, it is a well-preserved example of worker housing built for employees of local shoe factories.  It was listed on the National Register of Historic Places in 1984.

Description and history
The C.H. Brown Cottage stands in a residential area one block west of Stoneham's Central Square, on the west side of Wright Street midway between Maple and Lincoln Streets.  It is a small -story wood-frame structure, with a gabled roof and clapboarded exterior.  Its front facade is two bays wide, with pilastered corners and a narrow entablature on the sides.  The main entrance is in the right bay, flanked by full-length sidelight windows and pilasters, which support an entablature and cornice.  A single-story ell of modern construction extends to the rear.

The cottage was probably built in sometime in the 1830s, based on stylistic analysis; its original owner is unknown.  A later owner, C.H. Brown, was one of the proprietors of a local tannery; he lived in a mansion at Chestnut and Maple Streets.  It is one of a modest number of worker housing units to survive from Stoneham's early industrial period as shoemaking center.

See also
National Register of Historic Places listings in Stoneham, Massachusetts
National Register of Historic Places listings in Middlesex County, Massachusetts

References

Houses completed in 1835
Houses on the National Register of Historic Places in Stoneham, Massachusetts
Houses in Stoneham, Massachusetts